The asefru (pl. isefra) is a poetic composition of the Berber literature of Kabylia. It is a sort of short sonnet with a ternary structure, formed by three strophes of three verses each. The rhymes follow the pattern AAB AAB AAB, while the length of the three verses of each strophe is 7 + 5 + 7 syllables.

It is a relatively new meter compared to those from traditional poetry, probably born around the middle of the 19th century, and the poet who has indissolubly linked his name to this type of composition is Si Mohand. The asefru is usually read or recited but can also be sung, and numerous examples of isefra sung are present in the repertoire of different Kabyle singers, such as Taos Amrouche (for example Vaste est la prison, Vast is the prison), Slimane Azem (Effɤ ay ajrad tamurt-iw, Grasshopper, leave my country) or Malika Domrane (Nnehta, Sighing).

An example of asefru (Si Mohand):

Algerian literature
Poetic forms
Berber culture
Kabylie